The 2003 Rally Australia (formally the 16th Telstra Rally Australia) was the tenth round of the 2003 World Rally Championship. The race was held over four days between 4 September and 7 September 2003, and was based in Perth, Australia. Subaru's Petter Solberg won the race, his 3rd win in the World Rally Championship.

Background

Entry list

Itinerary
All dates and times are AWST (UTC+8).

Results

Overall

World Rally Cars

Classification

Special stages

Championship standings

Production World Rally Championship

Classification

Special stages

Championship standings

References

External links 
 Official website of the World Rally Championship

Australia
Rally Australia
Rally